The 43rd National Film Awards, was presented on 8 December 2019 by Ministry of Information, Bangladesh to felicitate the best of Bangladeshi films released in the calendar year 2018.

Lifetime Achievement

List of winners

References

External links

National Film Awards (Bangladesh) ceremonies
2018 film awards
2019 awards in Bangladesh
2019 in Dhaka
November 2019 events in Bangladesh